Events from the year 1494 in France

Incumbents
 Monarch – Charles VIII

Events

Births

Full date missing
Francis I of France (died 1547)
Oronce Finé, mathematician and cartographer (died 1555)
Jean Parmentier, navigator, cartographer, and poet (died 1529)
Renée of Bourbon, dutchess consort (died 1539)

Deaths

Full date missing
Philippe de Crèvecœur d'Esquerdes, military commander (born 1418)
Gérard Gobaille, bishop

See also

References

1490s in France